Cyril Amarchand Mangaldas is a full service Indian law firm, with its headquarters in Mumbai, India. The firm came into existence on 11 May 2015 from its predecessor Amarchand & Mangaldas & Suresh A Shroff & Co. As of 1 April 2020 the firm had 750 lawyers and 132 partners.

Locations
The firm is located in various locations in India;  Mumbai, Delhi, Bengaluru, Hyderabad, Ahmedabad, and Chennai.

Advisory board
The external board members advise the firm on strategic, policy, and governance related issues. The board is composed of N. R. Narayana Murthy, cofounder of Infosys; Deepak Parekh, chairman at Housing Development Finance Corporation; Uday Kotak, vice-chairman and MD at Kotak Mahindra Bank; Janmejaya Sinha, chairman at Boston Consulting Group Asia Pacific, and Umakanth Varottil, assistant professor in the faculty of law at the National University of Singapore.

References

External links
Official Website

Law firms of India
Law firms established in 2015
2015 establishments in Maharashtra